Stuart Gage Lancaster (November 30, 1920 – December 22, 2000) was an American actor known for roles in Russ Meyer films.

Biography
Born in Evanston, Illinois, Lancaster's grandfather was circus owner Charles Ringling. He served as an aviator in the United States Navy in World War II. He moved to Los Angeles in 1962. 

Lancaster appeared in several Meyer films, including Mudhoney, Faster, Pussycat! Kill! Kill!, Good Morning and... Goodbye!, Supervixens, and Beneath the Valley of the Ultra-Vixens. He also had a recurring role on The Young and the Restless and a part in Edward Scissorhands.  He was sometimes credited as Stewart Lancaster or Stud Lancaster.  

Lancaster was the founder and director of the Palm Tree Playhouse in Sarasota, Florida. He died in Los Angeles, California. His wife Ivy Bethune and stepdaughter Zina Bethune were both actresses. He had five children, Mark Lancaster, Paul Gooding, Lynne Lancaster, John Lancaster aka Guruatma S. Khalsa and Michael Lancaster.

Selected filmography

 Mudhoney (1965) – Lute Wade
 Faster, Pussycat! Kill! Kill! (1965) – The Old Man
 The Born Losers (1967) – Sheriff Harvey
 Good Morning and... Goodbye! (1967) – Burt Boland
 Mantis in Lace (1968) – Frank
 Thar She Blows! (1968) – Kenyon Adler
 The Secret Sex Lives of Romeo and Juliet (1969) – Lord Capulet
 The Ecstasies of Women (1969) – Bartender (uncredited)
 Precious Jewels (1969)
 Starlet! (1969) – Kenyon Adler
 The Satin Mushroom (1969) – Mexican Lawyer
 Wilbur and the Baby Factory (1970) – W.W.
 Captain Milkshake (1970) – Cabby
 Siegfried und das sagenhafte Liebesleben der Nibelungen (1971) – King Gunther (English version, voice, uncredited)
 The Seven Minutes (1971) – Dr. Roger Trimble
 Godmonster of Indian Flats (1973) – Mayor Charles Silverdale
 Supervixens (1975) – Lute
 Goodbye, Norma Jean (1976) – George
 Alex Joseph and His Wives (1977) – Motel Manager
 Hughes and Harlow: Angels in Hell (1977) – Charlie
 The Brain Machine (1977) – Senator
 Beneath the Valley of the Ultra-Vixens (1979) – The Man From Small Town U.S.A.
 Mistress of the Apes (1979) – Brady
 The Loch Ness Horror (1982) – Professor Pratt
 The Naked Gun: From the Files of Police Squad! (1988) – Press Conference Toilet Voiceover (uncredited)
 Down on Us (1989) – New York Cabbie
 Goodnight, Sweet Marilyn (1989) – George
 Edward Scissorhands (1990) – Retired Man
 Batman Returns (1992) – Penguin's Doctor
 The Treat (1998) – Vinny (final film role)

References

External links

Stuart Lancaster profile at the Colony Theatre Company

1920 births
2000 deaths
American male film actors
Male actors from Evanston, Illinois
20th-century American male actors